Grzimek is a German surname of Polish origin. It may refer to the following people:
Bernhard Grzimek (1909–1987), German zoologist, author, editor and animal conservationist
Grzimek's Animal Life Encyclopedia
Martin Grzimek (born 1950), German author
Michael Grzimek (1934–1959), German zoologist, conservationist and filmmaker, son of Bernhard
Sabina Grzimek (born 1942), German sculptor 
Waldemar Grzimek (1918–1984), German sculptor, father of Sabina

German-language surnames